The Vallemaggia District is a district of the canton of Ticino in Switzerland. The capital of the district is Cevio.

Geography
Of this area,  or 1.7% is used for agricultural purposes, while  or 42.2% is forested.

Of the built up area, housing and buildings made up 0.4% and transportation infrastructure made up 0.4%.  Out of the forested land, 31.4% of the total land area is heavily forested and 4.8% is covered with orchards or small clusters of trees.  Of the agricultural land, 1.1% is used for growing crops.  Of the water in the district, 0.7% is in lakes and 2.0% is in rivers and streams.  Of the unproductive areas, 18.9% is unproductive vegetation and 24.0% is too rocky for vegetation.

Demographics
Of the Swiss national languages, 477 speak German, 88 people speak French, 4,814 people speak Italian, and 12 people speak Romansh.  The remainder (202 people) speak another language.

, the gender distribution of the population was 49.2% male and 50.8% female.  The population was made up of 2,532 Swiss men (43.1% of the population), and 356 (6.1%) non-Swiss men.  There were 2,731 Swiss women (46.5%), and 252 (4.3%) non-Swiss women.

In  there were 38 live births to Swiss citizens and 2 births to non-Swiss citizens, and in same time span there were 57 deaths of Swiss citizens and 5 non-Swiss citizen deaths.  Ignoring immigration and emigration, the population of Swiss citizens decreased by 19 while the foreign population decreased by 3.  There were 3 Swiss men and 20 Swiss women who immigrated back to Switzerland.  At the same time, there were 25 non-Swiss men and 10 non-Swiss women who immigrated from another country to Switzerland.  The total Swiss population change in 2008 (from all sources) was an increase of 9 and the non-Swiss population change was a decrease of 2 people.  This represents a population growth rate of 0.1%.

The age distribution, in the Vallemaggia District is: 518 children or 8.8% of the population are between 0 and 9 years old and 667 teenagers or 11.4% are between 10 and 19.  Of the adult population, 565 people or 9.6% of the population are between 20 and 29 years old.  656 people or 11.2% are between 30 and 39, 962 people or 16.4% are between 40 and 49, and 859 people or 14.6% are between 50 and 59.  The senior population distribution is 729 people or 12.4% of the population are between 60 and 69 years old, 493 people or 8.4% are between 70 and 79, there are 422 people or 7.2% who are over 80.

 there were 7,245 single family homes (or 80.1% of the total) out of a total of 9,049 inhabited buildings.  There were 972 two family buildings (10.7%) and 533 multi-family buildings (5.9%).  There were also 299 buildings in the district that were multipurpose buildings (used for both housing and commercial or another purpose).

 there were 4,844 apartments in the district.  The most common apartment size was the 4 room apartment of which there were 1,334.  There were 400 single room apartments and 1,203 apartments with five or more rooms.  Of these apartments, a total of 2,195 apartments (45.3% of the total) were permanently occupied, while 2,620 apartments (54.1%) were seasonally occupied and 29 apartments (0.6%) were empty.

The historical population is given in the following table:

Politics
In the 2007 federal election the most popular party was the FDP which received 29.82% of the vote.  The next three most popular parties were the CVP (28.74%), the SP (17.31%) and the Ticino League (12.2%).  In the federal election, a total of 1,907 votes were cast, and the voter turnout was 45.8%.

In the  Ticino Gran Consiglio election, there were a total of 4,190 registered voters in the Vallemaggia District, of which 2,778 or 66.3% voted.  28 blank ballots were cast, leaving 2,750 valid ballots in the election.  The most popular party was the PPD+GenGiova which received 693 or 25.2% of the vote.  The next three most popular parties were; the SSI (with 564 or 20.5%), the PLRT (with 511 or 18.6%) and the PS (with 436 or 15.9%).

In the  Ticino Consiglio di Stato election, 22 blank ballots and 9 null ballots were cast, leaving 2,747 valid ballots in the election.  The most popular party was the PPD which received 701 or 25.5% of the vote.  The next three most popular parties were; the LEGA (with 518 or 18.9%), the PS (with 511 or 18.6%) and the PLRT (with 484 or 17.6%).

Religion
There are 441 individuals (or about 7.88% of the population) who belong to another church (not listed on the census), and 258 individuals (or about 4.61% of the population) did not answer the question.

Education
In the Vallemaggia District there was a total of 1,005 students.  The Ticino education system provides up to three years of non-mandatory kindergarten and in the Vallemaggia District there were 135 children in kindergarten.  The primary school program lasts for five years and includes both a standard school and a special school.  In the district, 302 students attended the standard primary schools and 7 students attended the special school.  In the lower secondary school system, students either attend a two-year middle school followed by a two-year pre-apprenticeship or they attend a four-year program to prepare for higher education.  There were 267 students in the two-year middle school and 2 in their pre-apprenticeship, while 86 students were in the four-year advanced program.

The upper secondary school includes several options, but at the end of the upper secondary program, a student will be prepared to enter a trade or to continue on to a university or college.  In Ticino, vocational students may either attend school while working on their internship or apprenticeship (which takes three or four years) or may attend school followed by an internship or apprenticeship (which takes one year as a full-time student or one and a half to two years as a part-time student).  There were 53 vocational students who were attending school full-time and 132 who attend part-time.

The professional program lasts three years and prepares a student for a job in engineering, nursing, computer science, business, tourism and similar fields.  There were 21 students in the professional program.

Cities 
The District has 8 municipalities, namely Bosco Gurin, Campo, Cerentino, Cevio and Linescio in the Rovana Valley, and Maggia and Avegno Gordevio in the Valle Maggia, as well as Lavizzara in the Valle Lavizzara.

References

External links
 Official list of municipalities, circles and districts of Ticino

Districts of Ticino